The Child Care and Development Block Grant (CCDBG), also called the Child Care and Development Fund, is the primary source of United States federal funding for child care subsidies for low-income working families and funds to improve child care quality.

Some states also provide child care assistance through Temporary Assistance for Needy Families (TANF) funds. States design their own child care assistance programs within minimal federal guidelines.

Child care assistance helps families succeed financially. When families receive child care assistance they are more likely to be employed and to have higher earnings. Approximately 1.8 million children  receive CCDBG-funded child care in an average month. Yet, only one in seven eligible children receives child care assistance.

History

Funding was first authorized under the CCDBG Act of 1990, which was enacted under the Omnibus Budget Reconciliation Act of 1990.
 
Since CCDBG’s inception, much has been learned about the role of early learning and development on the success of a child, and CCDBG has become an important tool not just for helping families work, but also for helping them ensure their children get a strong start in life. When CCDBG won bipartisan reauthorization in 2014, the act explicitly named child development as one of its objectives. It mandated a certain percentage of the funds be used to increase quality in subsidized child care, established new health and safety standards, earmarked funds specifically for infants and toddlers, and required states provide families with information about providers’ licensing, histories, and inspections.

Even as political polarization has increased, CCDBG has retained wide bipartisan support. In 2018, Republican President Donald Trump and majorities in both parties approved a historic increase of $2.37 billion for CCDBG. 

During the COVID-19 pandemic, Republicans and Democrats both prioritized child care as a crucial component for getting essential workers into the workplace, fueling workforce expansion, and simultaneously supporting the safety and development of children. All of the major relief packages passed by Congress contained significant infusions into CCDBG.

See also
Administration for Children and Families
Child Care and Development Block Grant Act of 2013 (S. 1086; 113th Congress)

Notes

Federal assistance in the United States